Jade Love is a 1984 Taiwanese film directed and written by Chang Yi, based on Pai Hsien-yung's 1960 novella of the same name. The story is set in mainland China.

Censors from the Government Information Office removed four minutes (including an explicit sex scene) from the film. The uncensored version was not released until 2012.

Awards and nominations

References

External links

Taiwanese drama films
1980s Mandarin-language films
1984 films